Georges Dubois (18 March 1865–17 May 1934) was a French sculptor who produced a bust of Frédéric Chopin for a memorial in the Jardin du Luxembourg in Paris. He won a silver medal in the mixed sculpturing event at the 1912 Summer Olympics.

Career
In 1900, Dubois produced a bust of Frédéric Chopin for a memorial in the Jardin du Luxembourg in Paris. The bust had been requested the year before, to commemorate the 50th anniversary of Chopin's death, by Jules Massenet.

In 1906, Dubois met with the Olympic Committee to discuss adding art competitions to the Summer Olympic Games. Dubois was a speaker at the event, and also produced a fencing display. He entered a plaster model of the doors of a gymnasium, entitled Model of the entrance to a modern stadium, into the mixed sculpturing event at the 1912 Summer Olympics in Stockholm, Sweden. He was awarded a silver medal.

Works
 Dubois, Georges, Le point d'honneur et le duel, dispositions spéciales d'après-guerre (The point of honour and the duel, special post-war arrangements), 1909
 Dubois, Georges, L'escrime au théâtre (Fencing in the theatre), 1910

Source:

References

19th-century French sculptors
20th-century French sculptors
1865 births
1934 deaths
French male writers
Olympic silver medalists in art competitions
Medalists at the 1912 Summer Olympics
Olympic competitors in art competitions